Hohen Neuendorf West is a railway station in the western part of the town of Hohen Neuendorf which is located in the Oberhavel district of Brandenburg, Germany.

References

Railway stations in Brandenburg
Railway stations in Germany opened in 1954
Buildings and structures in Oberhavel